Paul Murphy may refer to:

Sportspeople
 Paul Murphy (English footballer) (born 1954), English football player for Workington
 Paul Murphy (Derry Gaelic footballer) (born 1979), Irish Gaelic footballer
 Paul Murphy (Kerry Gaelic footballer) (born 1991), Irish Gaelic footballer
 Paul Murphy (hurler) (born 1989), Irish hurler

Politicians
 Paul Murphy (Irish politician) (born 1983), Solidarity TD (Dublin South West) and former Socialist Party MEP
 Paul Murphy (Manitoba politician), Canadian politician
 Paul Murphy (Massachusetts politician) (1932–2020), American politician
 Paul Murphy, Baron Murphy of Torfaen (born 1948), Welsh Labour Party politician

Others
 Paul Murphy (Australian journalist), Australian political journalist
 Paul Murphy (British journalist), founder editor of FT Alphaville
 Skratch Bastid (Paul Murphy, born 1982), Canadian hip hop DJ
 Paul Murphy (musician) (born 1949), jazz percussionist
 Paul St. Clair Murphy, United States Marine Corps officer

See also
 Paul Morphy (1837–1884), chess player